is a district of Shibuya, Tokyo, Japan.

As of October 2020, the population of this district is 2,062. The postal code for Maruyamachō is 150–0044.

The nightclub Womb, which featured in the 2006 Alejandro González Iñárritu film Babel, is located here.

Geography
Maruyamachō borders Shōtō in the north, Dōgenzaka to the east, Nanpeidaichō to the south, and Shinsenchō to the west.

Education
 operates public elementary and junior high schools.

All of Maruyamacho is zoned to Jinnan Elementary School (神南小学校), and Shoto Junior High School (松濤中学校).

References

Neighborhoods of Tokyo
Shibuya